Circo de Bakuza is a Canadian production company located in Montreal, Quebec, with a satellite office in Paris, France.  its most prominent production is the entire set of pre-game shows and opening and closing ceremonies for France's Euro 2016 soccer tournament.

Background
Circo de Bakuza was founded in 2009 by Vincent Drolet. The name Circo de Bakuza was a Montreal street show previously created by the founder of the agency, and a reference to the bacchanalian culture. The company's first gig was for the 5th Dubai International Film Festival. The company initially focused on galas and product launches, but rapidly produced soccer-related events as well.

Major Performances
 2014 UEFA Champions League Final opening ceremonies
 2015 UEFA Champions League Final opening ceremonies 
 2016 UEFA Champions League Final opening ceremonies 
 Euro 2016 opening ceremonies
 Euro 2016 pre-game shows 
 Euro 2016 closing ceremonies
 2016 Montreal Olympics 40th Anniversary of the 1976 Summer Olympics anniversary ceremonies

Awards
 2015 EUBEA Best Sport Event; for Berlin Opening Ceremonies of Euro 2016

References

Companies based in Quebec
Entertainment companies of Canada